Afipia massiliensis is a species of the Afipia bacterial genus. It is a gram-negative, oxidase-positive rod in the alpha-2 subgroup of the class Proteobacteria. It is motile by means of a single flagellum. Its type strain is 34633T (=CIP 107022T =CCUG 45153T).

References

Further reading

External links
LPSN

Type strain of Afipia massiliensis at BacDive -  the Bacterial Diversity Metadatabase

Nitrobacteraceae
Bacteria described in 2002